"Modern Times" is the name of a 2004 song recorded by the Californian singer J-five. Released in 2004 as the first single from his debut album Sweet Little Nothing on which it is the third track, "Modern Times" achieved a success in many European countries, topping the charts in France, traditionally a nation where Chaplin films are most popular.

Release
The song is a tribute to Charlie Chaplin, and particularly his film Modern Times. The chorus of the song is the original recording of Chaplin's gibberish singing from the end of the film (the first time Chaplin's voice had been heard in any of his films, using a deliberately vague mixture of languages).

A music video was produced to illustrate this track, using the appropriate scene from the Chaplin film with the exclusive participation of Dolores Chaplin.

The song is included on the following compilations, released in 2004 in France: Best Of 2004, R&B 2004, NRJ Hit Music Only and Fan2.

Chart performances
In France, the single entered the chart at No. 15 on February 29, 2004, and gained a few places every week until topping the chart for one week, on March 21. The weeks after, the single almost didn't stop to drop on the chart and totaled nine weeks in the top ten, 17 weeks in the top 50 and 25 weeks on the chart. It was certified Silver disc by the SNEP and was ranked No. 33 on the End of the Year Chart.

Track listings
 CD single
 "Modern Times" featuring Charlie Chaplin – 3:16
 "Flags" – 3:22

 CD maxi
 "Modern Times" featuring Charlie Chaplin – 3:16
 "Flags" – 3:22
 "Turn It up" – 2:06

 CD maxi
 "Modern Times" (original version) featuring Charlie Chaplin – 3:23
 "Modern Times" (rove dogs remix) – 3:43
 "Flags" – 2:06
 "Modern Times" (video)

Personnel
 Recorded by Len Corey
 Produced by D&N Godsend and Mel Richd
 Artwork by Objectif Lune
 Photography by S. Girzard

 "Modern Times"
 Written by J-Five / Daniderff / D&N Godsend / Mel Richd/Bertal & Maubon
 Engineered by Len Corey
 Performed by J-Five and Charles Chaplin
 Charles Chaplin appears courtesy of Roy Export Ltd.

 "Flags"
 Written by J-Five / D&N Godsend / Mel Richd
 Engineered Len Corey

 Rove dogs remix
 Vocals and keyboards by Franck Lascombes
 Engineered and mixed by Mr Clean

Charts and sales

Weekly charts

1 Remix

Year-end charts

Certifications

References

J-five songs
2004 debut singles
SNEP Top Singles number-one singles
2004 songs